Delia Duca Iliescu (or Delia Monica Duca, born in 1986) is a TV host presenting a national TV show about chess on romanian Realitatea Plus TV channel, called “Strategie in alb si negru“ (“Strategy in black and white”)- with weekly editions starting from 2015. She was Miss Universe Romania 2012 and represented her country at the Miss Universe 2012. She is an IT professional, a chess player and FIDE chess arbiter.

Pageant experiences
 In 2008, she competed at Miss Tourism Queen International 2008 (China), and placed in Top 20 semi-finalists.
 In 2010, she competed at Miss Globe International 2010 (Cyprus), and placed in Top 15 semi-finalists and was awarded as Miss Sympathy.
 In 2011, she won the title Miss Intercontinental Romania and competed in Miss Intercontinental 2011 (Spain).
 In 2012, she competed at Miss United Nations 2012 (USA) and won the Supermodel United Nations 2012 title.
 In 2012, she competed at Supermodel International 2012 (Thailand) where she placed Top 15 and she was awarded Miss Sun City.
 In 2012, she won Miss Universe Romania 2012 and represented Romania at Miss Universe 2012 (USA).
 In 2013, she won the 2nd runner-up title at Miss 7 Continents 2013 (Turkey).
 In 2013, she placed in Top 5 at Princess of the Globe 2013 (Turkey).
 In 2014, she competed at Miss Grand International 2014 (Thailand).
 In 2015, she won Miss Diamond of the World 2015 (Algeria).

Other achievements
Duca has a master's degree in computer science and works as a software engineer.
She was national champion in solving chess problems in 2006. She is a published chess problem composer and has organised multiple chess tournaments.

References

External links
 Official Miss Universe Romania website

Living people
Romanian beauty pageant winners
Miss Universe 2012 contestants
1986 births